Stoy is a surname. Notable people with the surname include:

Franklin Pierce Stoy (1854–1911), Mayor of Atlantic City, New Jersey from 1900 to 1911
Joe Stoy, British computer scientist